Veronica Hazelhoff (22 February 1947 – 1 July 2009) was a Dutch author of children's literature.

Career 

Hazelhoff made her debut in 1981 with the book Nou moe! She won the Gouden Ezelsoor award as well as the Zilveren Griffel award for this book. Hazelhoff's first three books, Nou moe! (1981), Hierzo! (1982) and Auww! (1983), feature the same character, a young girl called Maartje. Hazelhoff received an award for two out of these three books as Hazelhoff won the Gouden Griffel award in 1984 for the book Auww! Many of Hazelhoff's later books would also feature female protagonists.

She went on to win the Zilveren Griffel award two more times: in 1995 for the book Veren en in 2007 for her book Bezoek van Mister P. Hazelhoff based her book Bezoek van Mister P. on her own experience with rheumatism from which she suffered herself for most her life.

Hazelhoff also won the Nienke van Hichtum-prijs in 1995 for her book Veren (1994).

Her books have been illustrated by various illustrators, including Joep Bertrams, Sandra Klaassen and Sylvia Weve.

Publications 

 1981: Nou moe!
 1982: Hierzo!
 1983: Auww!
 1983: Oma, waar blijft de taart?
 1985: Kinderkamp Utopia
 1986: Fenna
 1987: Ster!
 1988: Heibel
 1989: In Sara's huis
 1990: Mooie dagen
 1990: Het zondagsgevoel
 1990: Boze ogen
 1991: Naar Nebraska
 1992: Een klein kreng
 1992: De bijenkoningin
 1993: Elmo
 1994: Veren
 1995: De sneeuwstorm
 1995: Lieve Liza
 1996: De Duivenjongen
 1997: Niks gehoord, niks gezien
 1999: Verloren paradijs
 2001: Kat en Jong
 2006: Bezoek van Mister P.

Awards 

 1983: Gouden Ezelsoor, Nou moe!
 1983: Zilveren Griffel, Nou moe!
 1984: Gouden Griffel, Auww!
 1995: Nienke van Hichtum-prijs, Veren
 1995: Zilveren Griffel, Veren
 2007: Zilveren Griffel, Bezoek van Mister P.

References

External links 

 Veronica Hazelhoff (in Dutch), Digital Library for Dutch Literature
 Veronica Hazelhoff (in Dutch), jeugdliteratuur.org

1947 births
2009 deaths
Dutch children's writers
Dutch women children's writers
20th-century Dutch women writers
21st-century Dutch women writers
Nienke van Hichtum Prize winners
Gouden Griffel winners